Ministry of War may refer to:
 Ministry of War (imperial China) (c.600–1912)
 Chinese Republic Ministry of War (1912–1946)
 Ministry of War (Kingdom of Bavaria) (1808–1919)
 Ministry of War (Brazil) (1815–1999)
 Ministry of War (Estonia) (1918–1928; 1937-1940)
 Ministry of War (France) (1791–1947)
 Ministry of War (pre-modern Japan) (702–1872)
 Ministry of the Army (Japan, 1872–1945)
 War Ministry (Portugal) (1820–1974)
 Prussian Ministry of War (1808–1919)
 Ministry of War of the Russian Empire (1802–1917)
 Ministry of War of Saxony (1831–1919)
 Ministry of War of Württemberg (1806–1919)

See also
 Ministry of defence, a type of government department
 Department of Defence
 War Department
 War cabinet, a committee formed by a government in a time of war
 Chamberlain war ministry, the United Kingdom government 1939–1940
 Churchill war ministry, the United Kingdom government 1940–1945
 Ministry of War Transport (United Kingdom, 1941–1946)